Judith Huxley (1926 – 17 October 1983) was an American food columnist for The Washington Post.

She was born in Boston, Massachusetts.   She lived in New York, New York, where she was a publicity writer for the Federation of Jewish Philanthropies Appeal and was also a writer for the Rockefeller Foundation and J. Walter Thompson.

She moved to Washington, D.C. in 1963.  She was a contributor to Food & Wine magazine and The Washingtonian magazine.  A book, Judith Huxley's Table for eight: Recipes and Menus for Entertaining with the Seasons was published posthumously.

She was the second wife of Matthew Huxley.  She died of cancer.

External links 
 https://query.nytimes.com/gst/fullpage.html?res=9C06E7DD123BF933A15753C1A965948260

American columnists
1926 births
1983 deaths
20th-century American writers
20th-century American journalists